The 1984 uprising in Morocco, also known as the Bread Uprising, the Hunger Uprising or the Students' Uprising, was a group of protest movements that broke out on January 19, 1984 in a number of Moroccan cities, reaching its climax in the northern cities of Al Hoceima, Nador, Tetouan, Ksar el-Kebir, as well as Marrakesh. Initially, the movement was composed of student demonstrations, but other social strata began to join them during a worsening economic context marked by the beginning of Morocco's implementation of the tedious structural adjustment policy, at the time, by the International Monetary Fund, whose repercussions were the high cost of living and the application of additional fees for education. The protests were met with police repression and widespread arrests, with 200 being killed in the uprising. Social protests had occurred throughout 1982-1983 while mass protests and labor strikes occurred weeks before the national rebellion.

See also
 1965 Moroccan riots
 1981 Moroccan riots
 1988 October Riots in Algeria
 2011-2012 Moroccan protests
 Hirak Rif Movement

References

Protests in Morocco